Aaron David Miller is an American Middle East analyst, author, and negotiator. He is a senior fellow at the Carnegie Endowment for International Peace, focusing on U.S. foreign policy. He previously was vice president for new initiatives at the Woodrow Wilson International Center for Scholars, and has been an advisor to both Republican and Democratic secretaries of state. He is a Global Affairs Analyst for CNN.

Miller worked for the United States Department of State for 24 years (1978–2003). Between 1988 and 2003, Miller served six secretaries of state as an advisor on Arab-Israeli negotiations, participating in American efforts to broker agreements between Israel, Jordan, Syria, and the Palestinians. He left the State Department in January 2003 to serve as president of Seeds of Peace, an international youth organization founded in 1993. In January 2006, Miller joined the Woodrow Wilson International Center for Scholars in Washington, D.C., first as public policy scholar, and later as vice president for new initiatives. In 2014, Miller published his fifth book, The End of Greatness: Why America Can't Have (and Doesn't Want) Another Great President.

Background 
Miller was born to a Jewish family in Cleveland, Ohio, the eldest son of Dr. Ruth (née Ratner) and Samuel H. Miller. He attended Shaker Heights High School, graduating in 1967. Miller lives with his wife Lindsay. They have two children.

Education 
Miller began his undergraduate career at Tulane University and spent a semester at the University of Warwick on a history honors exchange program before graduating from the University of Michigan with a B.A. in 1971. Continuing on toward an M.A. in American Civil War history, Miller changed fields to Middle Eastern and American diplomacy and spent 1973 to 1974 in Jerusalem studying Arabic and Hebrew. He completed his Ph.D. in 1977. His dissertation, Search for Security: Saudi Arabian Oil and American Foreign Policy, 1939–1949 was published by the University of North Carolina Press in 1980, and in paperback in 1991.

Government career 
Miller entered the Department of State in November 1978 as an historian in the Bureau of Public Affairs Office of the Historian, where he edited the documentary series Foreign Relations of the United States. In November 1980, he became the State Department's top analyst for Lebanon and the Palestinians in the Bureau of Intelligence and Research (INR). Awarded an International Affairs Fellowship by the Council on Foreign Relations, he spent 1982–83 at the Georgetown Center for Strategic and International Studies and the CFR in New York, where he wrote his second book, The PLO and the Politics of Survival. The following year he returned to INR and served a temporary tour at the U.S. Embassy in Amman, Jordan, before joining the Secretary of State's Policy Planning Staff in 1985. Between 1985 and 1993, Miller advised Secretaries of State George Shultz and James Baker, helping the latter plan the Madrid Peace Conference of October 1991.

In June 1993, Miller was appointed Deputy Special Middle East Coordinator. For the next seven years, he worked as part of a small interagency team where he helped structure the U.S. role in Arab–Israeli negotiations through the Oslo process, multilateral Arab–Israeli economic summits, the Israeli–Jordanian peace treaty, and final status negotiations between Israel and Syria and between Israel and the Palestinians at Camp David in July 2000. Miller continued work on Arab–Israeli issues in the George W. Bush administration, serving as the senior advisor on Arab–Israeli negotiations in the Bureau of Near Eastern Affairs to Secretary of State Colin Powell. He resigned from the Department of State in January 2003 to become president of Seeds of Peace.

After government 
In January 2006, Miller became a Public Policy Scholar at the Woodrow Wilson International Center for Scholars, where he planned and participated in programs on the Middle East and Arab–Israeli issues. In 2008, he completed his fourth book, The Much Too Promised Land: America's Elusive Search for Arab–Israeli Peace, an insider's look based on 160 interviews with former presidents, secretaries of state, Arabs, and Israelis, American Jews, Arabs, and evangelical Christians on why America succeeded and failed in Arab–Israeli diplomacy over the past 40 years.

Media and public speaking 
Throughout his career, Miller has made frequent media and speaking appearances as an expert on Arab–Israeli and Middle Eastern issues, including on CNN, PBS, Fox News, the BBC, the CBC, and Al Jazeera.

In 2005 Miller was a featured presenter at the World Economic Forum in both Davos and Amman, Jordan. He has also lectured at Harvard University, Columbia University, New York University, University of California at Berkeley, University of Michigan, University of Virginia, The City Club of Cleveland, Chatham House, and The International Institute for Strategic Studies.

His articles and op-ed pieces have appeared in numerous publications, including The New York Times, The Washington Post, Los Angeles Times, The Wilson Quarterly, and The International Herald Tribune.

Awards
Miller has received the Department of State's Distinguished, Meritorious and Superior Honor Awards. Between 1998 and 2000, he was appointed by President Bill Clinton to serve on the U.S. Holocaust Memorial Museum's Governing Council. In 2005, he was awarded the Ellis Island Medal of Honor.

Bibliography

Books 
 Search for Security: Saudi Arabian Oil and American Foreign Policy, 1939–1949 (Paperback, University of North Carolina Press, 1991) 
 PLO: Politics of Survival (Paperback, Praeger Press, 1983) 
 The Arab States and the Palestine Question: Between Ideology and Self-Interest (Paperback, Praeger Press, 1986) 
 The Much Too Promised Land: America’s Elusive Search for Arab-Israeli Peace (Hardcover, Bantam Books, 2008) 
 The End of Greatness: Why America Can't Have (and Doesn't Want) Another Great President (Hardcover, Palgrave Macmillan, 2014)

Articles 
 "The Abandonment: How the Bush Administration Left Israelis and Palestinians to Their Fate", The Washington Post (April 29, 2007) (accessdate May 25, 2011).
 "Annapolis Is Just the First Step" 
 "West Bank First: It Won't Work" 
 Robert Malley and Aaron David Miller, "For Israel and Hamas, a Case for Accommodation", The Washington Post (May 15, 2006) (accessdate May 25, 2011).
 "The Arab-Israeli conflict: Toward an Equitable and Durable Solution", bnet (July 2005) (accessdate May 25, 2011).
 "Israel's Lawyer", The Washington Post (May 23, 2005) (accessdate May 25, 2011).

References

External links
 Official site for Aaron David Miller's book The Much Too Promised Land and his blog
 The Woodrow Wilson Center for International Studies
 Seeds of Peace
 Official site for the book Inheriting the Holy Land
 Video (with mp3 available) interviews/discussions involving Miller on Bloggingheads.tv

American non-fiction writers
Living people
20th-century American Jews
Seeds of Peace
University of Michigan College of Literature, Science, and the Arts alumni
People from Shaker Heights, Ohio
Ratner family
21st-century American Jews
Year of birth missing (living people)